In the United States, a no-knock warrant is a warrant issued by a judge that allows law enforcement to enter a property without immediate prior notification of the residents, such as by knocking or ringing a doorbell. In most cases, law enforcement will identify themselves just before they forcefully enter the property. It is issued under the belief that any evidence they hope to find may be destroyed between the time that police identify themselves and the time they secure the area, or in the event where there is a large perceived threat to officer safety during the execution of the warrant.

Use of no-knock warrants has increased substantially over time. By one estimate, there were 1,500 annually in the early 1980s whereas by 2010 there were 60,000–70,000 no-knock or quick-knock raids conducted by local police annually, the majority of which were looking for marijuana.

Amid nationwide protests in response to the police killings of Breonna Taylor and George Floyd, there were extensive calls to end no-knock warrants. Critics argue that no-knock warrants were prone to lead to deadly use of force by police and the deaths of innocent people. They also argue that no-knock warrants conflict with the right to self-defense, "stand-your-ground" laws, and the castle doctrine, which explicitly permit the use of deadly force against intruders.

Currently, Florida, Oregon, Tennessee, and Virginia ban no-knock warrants; however, state-level bans do not affect federal law enforcement. Thirteen states have laws explicitly permitting no-knock warrants, and the remaining states issue them based on a judge's discretion.

History 
The use of no-knock warrants is a product of the country's "war on drugs" launched by President Richard Nixon in the 1970s, and which gained momentum in the 1980s under President Ronald Reagan. It is associated with the militarization of police.

Legal authority
English common law has required law enforcement to knock-and-announce since at least Semayne's case (1604), and in Miller v. United States (1958), the Supreme Court of the United States recognized that police must give notice before making a forced entry. In the U.S. federal criminal law, the rule generally requiring knock-and-announce is codified at 18 U.S.C § 3109.

The 1963 Supreme Court ruling Ker v. California set a precedent in favor of forcible police entries involving drugs out of concern that evidence could be destroyed. However, in Wilson v. Arkansas (1995) the Court created an exception to prevent the destruction of evidence. Richard v. Wisconsin in 1997 sought to add more clarification, allowing for no-knock searches when police have "a reasonable suspicion that knocking and announcing their presence, under the particular circumstances, would be dangerous or futile, or that it would inhibit the effective investigation of the crime by, for example, allowing the destruction of evidence," according to the ruling. Both the 1995 and 1997 rulings allowed local and state judges a lot of discretion in determining what constitutes “reasonable suspicion.”

In Hudson v. Michigan (2006) the Court held by a 5–4 vote that the exclusionary rule does not require the suppression of evidence police seize during an illegal forced entry.

According to the United States Department of Justice:

No-knock warrants may be issued in every state except Oregon (prohibited by state law), Florida (prohibited by a 1994 state supreme court decision), Virginia (prohibited through legislation passed in 2020), and Tennessee (prohibited through legislation passed in 2021). In Utah, a 2014 law prohibits no-knock warrants for cases involving only drug possession. A 2021 law passed in Maine limits no-knock warrants to certain high-risk situations and requires the use of body cameras. Thirteen states have laws explicitly authorizing no-knock warrants, and in 20 additional states, no-knock warrants are routinely granted.

Reform 
The act of entering someone's home by surprise, often late at night or early in the morning, creates a risk of violence, especially given the prevalence of gun ownership in United States.

Proposals for reform include legislating for a checklist of conditions to be applied for all police search warrants: "with some exceptions, officers should be in uniform; they should do the raid during the day; and they shouldn't rely on out-of-date intelligence about who lives in a targeted home."

In the wake of the Breonna Taylor shooting (March 2020) and the later (May–June 2020) George Floyd protests, the Louisville Metro Council unanimously voted on June 11, 2020, for "Breonna's Law", a ban on no-knock warrants in Louisville, Kentucky. The state of Kentucky restricted but did not ban their use in a law signed on April 9, 2020.

Statistics
The number of no-knock raids has increased from 3,000 in 1981 to more than 50,000 in 2005, according to Peter Kraska, a criminologist at Eastern Kentucky University in Richmond. In 2010, Kraska estimated 60,000–70,000 no-knock or quick-knock raids were conducted by local police annually, the majority of which were looking for marijuana. Raids that lead to deaths of innocent people are increasingly common; since the early 1980s, forty bystanders have been killed, according to the Cato Institute in Washington, D.C.

In Utah, no-knock warrants made up about 40% of warrants served by SWAT teams in 2014 and 2015, usually for drugs and usually done at night.  In Maryland, 90% of SWAT deployments were to serve search warrants, with two-thirds through forced entry.

From 2010 through 2016, at least 81 civilians and 13 officers died during SWAT raids, including 31 civilians and eight officers during execution of no-knock warrants.  Half of the civilians killed were members of a minority.  Of those subject to SWAT search warrants, 42% are black and 12% are Hispanic.  Since 2011, at least seven federal lawsuits against officers executing no-knock warrants have been settled for over $1 million.

Controversy 
No-knock warrants are controversial for various reasons. There have been cases where burglars have robbed homes by pretending to be officers with a no-knock warrant. There have been many cases where armed homeowners, believing that they are being invaded, have shot at officers, resulting in deaths on both sides. While it is legal to shoot a homeowner's dog when an officer fears for their life, there have been numerous high-profile cases in which family pets lacking the size, strength, or demeanor to attack officers have been shot, greatly increasing the risk of additional casualties in neighboring houses via overpenetrating bullets.

Case of Bounkham Phonesavanh
On May 27, 2014, in Cornelia, Georgia, a police informant alleged that he had bought $50 of methamphetamine from Wanis Thonetheva, a 30-year-old dealer at a residence belonging to Amanda Thonetheva, his mother. The dealer did not reside at the house, which contained no drugs or weapons, though a family with four young children lived in the house. Sheriff's Deputy Nikki Autry secured a no-knock warrant after awaking a county magistrate at his home and making inaccurate sworn statements to him.

Police executed a no-knock raid at 2:25 am on May 28, with a SWAT team breaching a door with a ram and throwing a flash-bang stun grenade into a room containing a 19-month-old child. The grenade exploded inside the infant's playpen, igniting the playpen and his pillow, causing "blast burn injuries to the face and chest; a complex laceration of the nose, upper lip and face; 20% of the right upper lip missing; the external nose being separated from the underlying bone; and a large avulsion burn injury to the chest with a resulting left pulmonary contusion and sepsis".

The infant, Bounkham Phonesavanh (or "Baby Bou Bou"), was placed in a medically induced coma, and needed a series of surgeries that cost more than a million dollars. He became the subject of a lawsuit against the police department to pay for the medical bills. The legal case argued that children's toys, including a plastic child's pool, were in the yard and the packaging for the playpen the infant was sleeping in was next to the door the police breached. The lawsuit alleged that police were "plainly incompetent" for failing to realize that a child was in the room.

The search yielded no drugs, no drug dealer and no weapons; the drug dealer was arrested the next day without the use of flash-bang grenades.

The civil lawsuit was eventually settled, with the county paying $3.6 million, including approximately $1.65 million in pain and suffering. A Habersham County, Georgia, grand jury declined to indict any of the participants, but did release a strongly worded report.  Federal prosecutors then secured an indictment against Deputy Autry.  She was acquitted of any wrongdoing by a federal jury after a week-long trial.

Case of Breonna Taylor
On March 13, 2020, Louisville Metro Police Department officers shot and killed Breonna Taylor in her apartment after being fired upon by Kenneth Walker, Breonna Taylor's boyfriend, while executing a search warrant shortly after midnight. Although the police had received court approval for a "no-knock" entry, they did knock and announce themselves prior to breaking down the door, according to Kentucky Attorney General Daniel Cameron. However, Walker claims that he only heard banging on the door and no announcement. Walker fired the first shot; Walker said he fired his gun due to not knowing the intruders were police.

Walker was charged with attempted murder of a police officer but the charge was dismissed in May 2020. On September 23, 2020, a grand jury indicted one officer for wanton endangerment for blindly firing shots that entered a neighbors' apartment, but no officers were charged in the death of Taylor. On October 20, 2020, Jefferson County Circuit Court Judge Annie O'Connell ruled that grand jury records could be released, and jurors could speak to the public, after which a grand juror claimed that the grand jury had only considered the charge of wanton endangerment, and did not consider any charges related to the death of Taylor.

Other examples
In 1999, Ismael Mena was shot and killed by SWAT team officers in Denver, Colorado, who were performing a no-knock raid that was approved by a judge acting on false information contained in a search warrant. The police believed there to be drugs in the house, but no drugs were found on the premises, and it was later revealed that the address given to the SWAT team by officer Joseph Bini was the wrong one. Jefferson County District Attorney Dave Thomas investigated the matter and cleared the officers involved with the raid on the grounds that Mena had pointed a gun and fired it at SWAT officers, although who fired first remains in dispute. However, many have objected to the investigation's findings due to inconsistencies in the various officers' account of what happened. The American Civil Liberties Union and others have objected to the Denver Police Department's request for a no-knock raid and the judge's decision to allow such a raid, on the grounds that they failed to meet the criteria necessary for such an operation.
Two former Los Angeles Police Department officers, along with 13 others, have plead guilty to running a robbery ring from 1999 to 2001 which used fake no-knock raids as a ruse to catch victims off guard.  The defendants would then steal cash and drugs to sell on the street.

Kathryn Johnston was a 92-year-old Atlanta, Georgia, woman killed by three undercover police officers during a no-knock raid on November 21, 2006. Assuming her home was being invaded, Johnston fired one shot through the front door which went over the officers' heads. Police fired 39 shots in response, five of which hit Johnston and some of which also hit the officers in an incident of friendly fire. One officer was later convicted for planting three bags of marijuana in the home; officers were also convicted on charges of manslaughter, making false statements, and conspiracy to violate civil rights resulting in death.
Tracy Ingle was shot in his house five times during a no-knock raid in North Little Rock, Arkansas in January 2008. After the police entered the house Tracy thought armed robbers had entered the house and intended to scare them away with a non-working gun. The police expected to find drugs, but none were found. He was brought to the intensive care, but police removed him from intensive care for questioning, after which they arrested him and charged him with assault on the officers who shot him.
In 2008, a SWAT team from Prince George's County, Maryland, conducted a raid at the home of Berwyn Heights resident Cheye Calvo after a package of marijuana was mailed to his house.  Both of his dogs were shot during the raid and it was later determined that he had no involvement with the package that was sent.  Police learned after entering the home and killing the dogs that Calvo was the mayor of Berwyn Heights, Maryland.
Hempstead, New York, settled claims by Iyanna Davis for $650,000 after police in May 2010 shot her in the breast during their accidental execution of a no-knock warrant on the wrong address. Officer Michael Capobianco explained that he had unintentionally shot the 22-year-old woman after he tripped.  Prosecutors did not file charges against the shooter.
In 2013, Tucson, Arizona, agreed to settle claims by the family of Jose Guerena for $3.4 million after SWAT officers fired 71 shots in the seven seconds after their unannounced entry.  Prosecutors did not file charges against the shooters.
A Burleson County, Texas, grand jury refused to indict Hank Magee for capital murder after he shot and killed a deputy sheriff inside his home during execution of a no-knock warrant on December 19, 2013.
In Killeen, Texas, a grand jury indicted Marvin Louis Guy for capital murder after he shot and killed a police detective outside his home during execution of a no-knock warrant on May 9, 2014. However, in September 2022, Bell County District Attorney's office announced it was no longer seeking the death penalty against Guy.
A Georgia SWAT team shot and killed an armed homeowner, David Hooks, during a September 2014 drug raid sparked by the word of a self-confessed methamphetamine addict and burglar who had robbed the property the previous day. David Hooks' wife, Teresa, looked outside and saw people with hoods on the evening of the raid and woke up her husband. Fearing the burglar or burglars who had struck two nights earlier had returned, Hooks armed himself. Despite the fact that the search warrant did not have a 'no knock' clause, the Drug Task Force and Special Response Team members broke down the back door of the family's home and entered, firing in excess of 16 shots. There is no evidence that David Hooks ever fired a weapon, nor was there any evidence he was involved in drugs. The Georgia Bureau of Investigation conducted an intensive 44-hour search of the property and came up with no contraband items.
In 2016, Framingham, Massachusetts, agreed to settle claims by the family of Eurie Stamps for $3.75 million after SWAT officers shot the 68-year-old in the back while he was compliant and lying on his stomach.  Prosecutors did not file charges against the shooter.
In December 2016, a jury in Corpus Christi, Texas, acquitted Ray Rosas of attempted capital murder because it concluded that he was unaware the three home intruders he shot were SWAT officers.  Prior to his acquittal, Rosas had spent 664 days in jail.
On January 28, 2019, in the Pecan Park area of Houston, Texas, Houston Police Department officers initiated a no-knock raid on a house, killing the two homeowners Dennis Tuttle and Rhogena Nicholas. Multiple officers were indicted for falsifying documents, including to obtain the no-knock warrant and to obstruct the ensuing investigation. One of these, the shooter, was charged with murder and admitted to planting false evidence at the crime scene.
On February 6, 2019, Milwaukee Police Department officer Matthew Rittner was shot and killed while conducting a no-knock raid. The shooter, Jordan P. Fricke, was charged with first-degree intentional homicide, and later convicted and sentenced to life in prison.
On March 12, 2020, Duncan Socrates Lemp was fatally shot at his home in Potomac, Maryland, during a no-knock police raid by the Montgomery County Police Department's SWAT team.
On February 2, 2022, 22-year-old Amir Locke was fatally shot by a Minneapolis Police Department SWAT officer executing a no-knock warrant in which Locke was not named as a suspect. Prosecutors declined to charge the officers involved.
Due to errors or acting on bad or faulty tips without double-checking information, Chicago Police Department has raided many wrong addresses. This has adversely affected good will towards officers in the community and cost the city a lot of money in legal settlements. While new search warrant policies have been implemented by the CPD, including mandatory pre-checks and additional supervisors, one victim said she still believes the police department has a long way to go, and is "traumatizing Black Chicagoans in the process".

See also
 Door breaching
Law enforcement in the United States
Militarization of police
Sneak and peek warrant
Police raid

References

Further reading
Balko, Radley, The Rise of the Warrior Cop: The Militarization of America's Police Forces. Public Affairs, 2014.
Donald E. Wilkes Jr, No Knock Search Warrants in Georgia (1996) & Explosive Dynamic Entry (2003) & SWATstika Policing (2006).

 - Article 7

External links
, Interview with Radley Balko, an investigative journalist and the author of the book Rise of the Warrior Cop, about police using the so-called no-knock warrants.

 
Law enforcement in the United States
Police misconduct in the United States
Law enforcement controversies